Vasil Gigiadze (born 3 June 1977) is a Georgian former footballer.

External links

 

Footballers from Georgia (country)
Georgia (country) international footballers
Expatriate footballers from Georgia (country)
Expatriate footballers in Russia
Expatriate footballers in Ukraine
Expatriate sportspeople from Georgia (country) in Ukraine
Russian Premier League players
Ukrainian Premier League players
Erovnuli Liga players
FC Kryvbas Kryvyi Rih players
FC Elista players
FC Naftovyk-Ukrnafta Okhtyrka players
SC Tavriya Simferopol players
Living people
1977 births
People from Kutaisi
Association football forwards